Amy Michelle Purdy (born November 7, 1979) is an American actress, model, para-snowboarder, motivational speaker, clothing designer and author. Purdy is a 2014 Paralympic bronze medalist, 2018 Paralympics silver medalist, and co-founder of Adaptive Action Sports.

Life and career
Purdy was born in Las Vegas in 1979. When she was 19 years old, she contracted Neisseria meningitidis, a form of bacterial meningitis. The disease affected her circulatory system when the infection led to septic shock;  both of her legs had to be amputated below the knee, she lost both kidneys, and her spleen had to be removed.  Doctors gave Purdy a 2% chance of survival.  Two years later, she received a kidney transplant from her father.

Purdy began snowboarding seven months after she received her prosthetic legs. About a year after her legs were amputated, she finished third in a snowboarding competition at Mammoth Mountain. Subsequently, she received a grant from the Challenged Athletes Foundation (CAF), a non-profit organization. Through this grant, she was able to compete in several snowboarding competitions in the U.S.

In 2003, Purdy was recruited by the CAF as spokesperson, and she moved to San Diego to be closer to the CAF headquarters. In San Diego, she continued her pre-amputee profession as a massage therapist. She also became involved in the modeling and acting industry. In February 2003, she played a model in a Madonna music video. Later in 2003, Purdy started working for Freedom Innovations, a prosthetic feet manufacturer, as its "Amputee Advocate".

She has gone on to co-found her own non-profit organization, Adaptive Action Sports, a chapter of Disabled Sports USA for individuals with physical disabilities who want to get involved in action sports (snowboarding, skateboarding, surfing) or art and music.

In 2005, Purdy made her film debut in What's Bugging Seth, a movie by Eli Steele.

She was named one of ESPNW's Impact 25 in 2014, and one of Oprah's SuperSoul 100 visionaries and influential leaders in 2016.

She retired from competitive sports in March 2022.

Television appearances
In 2012, Purdy and her now husband Daniel Gale participated on the 21st season of The Amazing Race. After nearly winning the first leg of the race, they were the second team eliminated and finished in 10th place out of 11 teams.

On February 5, 2014, Purdy was in a one-hour special on NBC television titled How to Raise an Olympian. The program, hosted by Meredith Vieira, chronicled the journeys of seven U.S. Olympians and included interviews with parents and coaches along with home video and photos from each athlete's childhood. Purdy went on to win the bronze medal in Snowboard Cross in the 2014 Winter Paralympics.

In 2015, Purdy was featured in a Super Bowl advertisement for the Toyota Camry. The advert features Purdy snowboarding, dancing, and adjusting her prosthetic legs with a voiceover of Muhammad Ali's "How Great I Am" speech. Reviews questioned the efficacy of the ad; "It’s really an ad about how amazing Amy Purdy is versus how amazing the new Camry is", said advertising professional Megan Hartman.

Book
On December 30, 2014, Purdy released a memoir entitled On My Own Two Feet: From Losing My Legs To Learning The Dance Of Life, published by HarperCollins.

Dancing 

Purdy was a contestant on season 18 of Dancing with the Stars. Paired with five-time champion Derek Hough, Purdy was the first double amputee contestant to ever appear on the show.

At the 2016 Summer Paralympics' opening ceremony, Purdy made an appearance performing a dance routine with what was promoted as a "surprise partner": a KUKA robotic arm.

In 2018 Amy was back on Dancing with the Stars Season 27 dancing with Tinashe & Brandon in a trio dance

References

External links

 
 
 
 

1979 births
Living people
American amputees
American disabled sportspeople
American female snowboarders
American film actresses
Paralympic snowboarders of the United States
Paralympic medalists in snowboarding
Paralympic silver medalists for the United States
Paralympic bronze medalists for the United States
Snowboarders at the 2014 Winter Paralympics
Snowboarders at the 2018 Winter Paralympics
Medalists at the 2014 Winter Paralympics
Medalists at the 2018 Winter Paralympics
Models with disabilities
Kidney transplant recipients
People from El Dorado County, California
People from Summit County, Colorado
Sportspeople from California
Sportspeople from Colorado
Sportspeople from the Las Vegas Valley
The Amazing Race (American TV series) contestants